Padmanabham mandal is one of the 46 mandals in Visakhapatnam District in India. It is under the administration of Visakhapatnam revenue division and the headquarters is located at Padmanabham. The Mandal is bounded by Bheemunipatnam, Anandapuram mandals in Visakhapatnam District and Bhogapuram mandal in Vizianagaram District. Great freedom fighter Alluri Sitarama Raju was born in Pandrangi village in this Mandal.Rajasagi Suryanarayana Raju, MLA Bheemili from 1972–78 is from this Mandal. Also Rajasagi Appalanarasimha Raju MLA Bheemili from 1985 to 2004 is also from this Mandal.

There's a famous Ananta Padmanabha Swami Temple in this mandal. Before independence, this temple was allotted 3,000 acres by the Pusapati royal family of Vizianagaram and the "Raja Sagi" royal family of Pandrangi.

Geography
It has an average elevation of 23 metres (78 feet)

Battle of Padmanabham
The Battle Of Padmanabham was fought on July9, 1794, between the British, led by Colonel Pendergast, and Pusapati Vijaya Rama Raju II of Vizianagaram. The Vizianagaram forces were led by Raja Sagi Rama Chandra Raju of the Pandrangi mokhasa family. The Raja of Vizianagaram was found in arrears of paying annual taxes to the British as he opposed British governance over his principality. Earlier, the chieftains of Vizianagaram aided French and later British in conquering the neighbouring principalities. However, they later fell out with their foreign allies. 

Colonel Pendergast was sent by the Governor of Madras, John Andrews. Both the Raja and his commander were killed, along with 800 soldiers of Vizianagaram, allowing the British to gain full control over the tiny principality. After the death of Pusapati Vijayarama Raju II, his son Pusapati Narayana Raju was guarded by the Raja Sagi family until 1796, when he was crowned king of the Vizianagaram estate.

Transport
APSRTC routes

References

Neighbourhoods in Visakhapatnam